Phyllopalpus is a genus of winged bush crickets, trigs in the family Trigonidiidae. There are about six described species in Phyllopalpus.

Species
These six species belong to the genus Phyllopalpus:
 Phyllopalpus batesii Kirby, W.F., 1906 c g
 Phyllopalpus brunnerianus (Saussure, 1874) c g
 Phyllopalpus caeruleus (Saussure, 1874) c g
 Phyllopalpus nigrovarius Walker, F., 1869 c g
 Phyllopalpus pulchellus Uhler, 1864 i c g b (handsome trig)
 Phyllopalpus pulcher Walker, F., 1869 c g
Data sources: i = ITIS, c = Catalogue of Life, g = GBIF, b = Bugguide.net

References

Further reading

External links

 

Crickets
Articles created by Qbugbot